is a Japanese politician of the Liberal Democratic Party, a member of the House of Representatives in the Diet (national legislature). A native of Kōtō, Tokyo and graduate of Keio University, he had served in the ward assembly of Kōtō for two terms since 1971 and the assembly of Tokyo for six terms since 1977. He was elected to the House of Representatives for the first time in 1998 but lost his seat two years later. He was re-elected in 2003.

References

External links 
 {{Official website|https://web.archive.org/web/20071009215045/http://www.kimura-ben.com/%7D%7Din Japanese.

1939 births
Living people
Politicians from Tokyo
Keio University alumni
Members of the House of Representatives (Japan)
Liberal Democratic Party (Japan) politicians
21st-century Japanese politicians